Mengxiu Township is a township in Ruili, Yunnan, China.

Etymology
The name of "Mengxiu" means a place where wild ginger grows in Dai language.

Administrative division
As of 2016, the township is divided into seven villages: 
Mengxiu
Huwa
Hulan
Mengdian
Dengzha
Nanjingli
Xiaojie

History
In the Qing dynasty and Republic of China, the indigenous people were Jingpo people.

On 25 February 1956, the Government of Ruili County set up the Mengxiu Production and Culture Station to maintain control of the region. In 1965. it came under the jurisdiction of Jiele District. During the Cultural Revolution, its name was changed to "Mengxiu People's Commune" and then "Red Flag People's Commune". It was incorporated as a township in 1986.

Geography
It lies at the northern of Ruili, bordering Myanmar to the northwest bounded by the Namwan River.

The highest point is Yingpan Mountain, elevation . The forest coverage rate of the township is 74%.

Economy
The township's economy is based on agriculture. The main crops are corn, rice, lemon, and walnut.

Demographics

In 2016, the local population was 11,786, including 6,190 Han (52.52%) and 4,604 Jingpo (39.06%).

Tourist attractions
The Ruili Botanical Garden sits in the township.

Transportation
The China National Highway 556 passes across the township. 

The Ruili Jingcheng Heliport serves the township.

References

Bibliography
 
 
 

Divisions of Ruili